William Noah (born 1944, Back River, Northwest Territories (now Nunavut)) is a former territorial level politician and artist. He served as a member of the Northwest Territories Legislature from 1979 until 1982.

Noah was first elected to the Northwest Territories Legislature in the 1979 Northwest Territories general election, winning the Keewatin North electoral district. He resigned before completing the end of his first term in 1982.

Noah currently resides in Baker Lake, Nunavut. He ran the constituency office for Baker Lake MLA David Simailak.  He currently works as a Community Liaison Officer on the Kiggavik Project for AREVA Resources Canada.

In 1998 the Macdonald Stewart Art Centre Marion Jackson, Judith Nasby, William Noah co-curated a major exhibition with catalogue both entitled Qamanittuaq (Where the River Widens): Drawings by Baker Lake Artists which included and a memoir by William Noah and distinguished drawings by Noah, his three siblings Janet Kigusiuq, Victoria Mamnguqsualuk, and Nancy Pukingrnak, and their mother— first-generation artist— Jessie Oonark  OC RCA.

Noah formed the Art and Cold Cash Collective, a five-person artists' collective, with Sheila Butler, Ruby Arngna'naaq, Patrick Mahon, and Jack Butler.

External links
William Noah
William Noah biography
Art and Cold Cash Collective

References

1944 births
Members of the Legislative Assembly of the Northwest Territories
Living people
Inuit politicians
People from Baker Lake
Inuit from the Northwest Territories
Inuit artists
20th-century Canadian politicians
20th-century Canadian artists
Inuit from Nunavut
Oonark family